Vselyub is an agrotown in Navahrudak District, Grodno Region, Belarus. Vselyub is a centre of selsoviet (rural council) within the administrative division of Belarus. Before the Partitions of Poland, it belonged to the Polish–Lithuanian Commonwealth. Between the 20th-century world wars, the village was part of Nowogródek Voivodeship of the Second Polish Republic.

History
Vselyub (Wsielub) was first mentioned in 1422 (on the seal of its owner). Since at least 1434, the settlement and its serfs belonged to Jan's son Andrzej Niemirowicz (Niemirycz). It was inherited by other members of the family. In 1576 it was bought by Prince Mikołaj Radziwiłł.

The local Catholic Church, built of brick and mortar, was long thought to have been erected in the Baroque period of the eighteenth century. But, archaeological examination in 1980s revealed that the building is essentially late Gothic (15th century). It has been altered by several renovations (the last of them, was done in the Gothic revival style). Its title changed several times in honor of different saints (St. John, St. Casimir, etc.)

During World War II, the 40 Jewish families who lived in the town were rounded up and summarily executed by the Nazis.

References

Villages in Belarus
Populated places in Grodno Region
Novogrudsky Uyezd
Nowogródek Voivodeship (1919–1939)
Holocaust locations in Belarus